Black dog syndrome or big black dog syndrome is a phenomenon in which black dogs are passed over for adoption in favor of lighter-colored animals. Animal shelters often use the term BBD, or big black dog, to describe the type of larger dark-colored mixed-breed said to be typically passed over by adopters. Black cats are similarly reported to be subject to the same phenomenon.

Theories
The proposed phenomenon may be due to a number of factors. Research has identified geographic location, fear stigma against certain breed types, and the fact that large, black dogs are often portrayed as aggressive in film and on television as possible correlates. Initial research at one location identified a longer period experienced by black dogs before adoption, but subsequent studies considered to be more robust (as conducted in a larger number of geographically spread shelters) has shown that when shelter visitors video-recorded their walk through the adoption area, they spent equal amounts of time looking at every dog, regardless of coat color. Other studies have suggested brindle dogs may be more likely to experience longer delays before adoption than black dogs. Coat color bias seems evident, but may change depending on geographic location.

Some people believe that during the pet adoption process some potential owners associate the color black with evil or misfortune (similar to the common superstition surrounding black cats), and this bias transfers over to their choice of dog. Additionally, many shelters feature photo profiles of their dogs on the shelter website. Because black dogs do not photograph well, lighter-colored dogs have an advantage with potential adopters browsing the site. A study done by the Los Angeles Animal Services challenges some of these claims, saying that a full 28% of adopted dogs are black. However, the bias theory simply asserts that predominantly dark animals take longer to be adopted than their lighter counterparts, and that large dogs take longer to adopt than small ones.

However, appearance in general does play a role in potential adopters' selection of shelter dogs. In a 2011 study by the ASPCA, appearance was the most frequently cited reason for adopters of both puppies (29 percent) and adult dogs (26 percent).

History
The issue has been gaining media attention since the mid-2000s. Tamara Delaney, an early activist against black dog syndrome, developed a website called Black Pearl Dogs in 2004 specifically to address the issue, both by educating the public about its existing, as well as showcasing individual dogs available for adoption.

Scientific studies
While many shelter workers claim the phenomenon is real, its acceptance is disputed, and quantitative analyses are limited.

Shelter studies
A 1992 article in the journal Animal Welfare, found that color was not a major factor in adoptions at a Northern Ireland shelter; black-and-white coats were most prevalent among adopted dogs, followed by yellow, solid black, gold, and black-and-tan coats. However, this did not take into account what percentage of the shelter populations had those colors to begin with, and thus says nothing about the chances of an individual dog of a particular color being adopted, compared to a dog of another color.

A 1998 study of 1,468 relinquished dogs offered for adoption at a local humane society found having a primarily black coat color was a variable associated with euthanasia, while gold, gray, and white coats colors were significant predictors of successful adoption.

A 2002 study published in the Journal of Applied Animal Welfare Science of dog and cat adoption in California animal shelters found pure-black coat colors to be negative factors in adoption rates for both dogs and cats.

In 2008 the general manager of the Los Angeles Animal Services department reported that twelve months of data on the intake of 30,046 dogs showed slightly more dogs that were predominantly or all black were adopted than dogs who were not predominantly or all black.

A 2010 PhD thesis analyzing multiple factors found a measurable variance contributing to dogs with primarily black coats being euthanized rather than adopted.

A 2013 study of dogs' length of stay (LOS) at two New York "no-kill" shelters determined that canine coat color had no effect. The study noted that coat color's effect on LOS may be localized, or may not generalize to traditional or other types of shelters.

A Masters thesis analysis of 16,800 dogs at two Pacific Northwest shelters found that black dogs were adopted more quickly than average at both shelters.

A 2013 study of cat adoption rates published in The Open Veterinary Science Journal concluded that "Results indicated that black cats, regardless of age or sex, require the longest time to adopt. They are followed by primarily black cats with other colors."

Studies based on images
A 1992 article in the journal Animal Welfare was conducted on adoptable dog characteristics. Participants in South Belfast were presented with photographs of dogs similar except for one manipulated feature, resulting in a statistically reliable preference for a blond coat (65%) over a black coat.

A 2012 report in the journal Society and Animals on a pair of studies recording participant rankings of pictured dogs of varying attributes along eight different personality traits did not find a bias against black dogs. In the first study, using four types of poodles (large black, small black, large white, and small white), 795 participants ranked black poodles as more friendly than white poodles. A second study with eight different breeds, including a black lab, suggested that the personality ratings of participants was based more on stereotypes of breed than on color. It concluded that "in general, with the exception of the golden retriever, black labs were perceived as consistently less dominant and less hostile than other large breeds, contrary to the assumption that large, black dogs are viewed negatively.
 
A 2013 study published in the journal Anthrozoös displayed photographs of dogs colored either yellow or black, and with floppy ears or pointy ears. It found that “participants rated the yellow dog significantly higher than the black dog on the personality dimensions of Agreeableness, Conscientiousness, and Emotional Stability.” It also found significant difference in ratings based on ear size, indicating “that people attribute different personality characteristics to dogs based solely on physical characteristics of the dog.”

A study presented at the 2013 International Society for Anthrozoology conference that showed participants pictures of cats and dogs of varying colors found white cats were considered the friendliest, orange cats second friendliest, and black cats least friendly. Among dogs, yellow dogs were considered friendliest, brown dogs second friendliest, and black dogs least friendly. Darker pets were similarly judged less adoptable, and black dogs were considered the most aggressive.

See also
 Pet adoption
 Black cat#Adoption and Black Cat Day
 List of cognitive biases

References

Bias
Dogs as pets
Animal shelters